Eulimella polita is a species of sea snail, a marine gastropod mollusk in the family Pyramidellidae, the pyrams and their allies.

Nomenclature
The name Eulimella polita (A. E. Verrill, 1872) [for a species from the NW Atlantic] is a secondary junior homonym of Eulimella polita de Folin, 1870 [for a species from West Africa], and thus an invalid name. In such a case, the International Code of Zoological Nomenclature requires that the younger name Eulimella polita (A.E. Verrill, 1872) be replaced by a substitute name. However, there is no substitute name available at this moment (January 2012). Until such a substitute name is established, WoRMS lists provisionally the two species as distinct, although one is designated by an invalid name.

Description
The size of the shell varies between 2 mm and 8.4 mm. This species differs from the other species in this genus by its continuous peristome. The teleoconch contains twelve whorls that are well rounded, smooth and glossy.

Distribution
This species occurs in the following locations:
 Cobscook Bay
 Gulf of Maine
 North West Atlantic Ocean

Notes
Additional information regarding this species:
 Distribution: Cobscook Bay and Eastport, Maine  to New Jersey

References

External links
 To Biodiversity Heritage Library (6 publications)
 To Encyclopedia of Life
 To ITIS
 To World Register of Marine Species

polita
Gastropods described in 1872